Kjosen may refer to the following locations:

Kjosen, Telemark, a village in Drangedal municipality, Telemark, Norway
Kjosen, Lyngen, a village in Lyngen municipality, Troms, Norway
Kjosen, Tromsø, a village in Tromsø municipality, Troms, Norway
Kjosen (Troms), a fjord arm off of the main Ullsfjorden in Tromsø/Lyngen municipalities, Troms county, Norway